The Leader Herald is a daily newspaper, serving the upstate New York Fulton, Hamilton, and Montgomery counties with a strong emphasis on Fulton County. The newspaper headquarters is located in Gloversville, New York.

The newspaper has over 5000 subscriptions and about 12,500 daily readers.

A three-part series of articles published by the Leader Herald in 2017 on the Ku Klux Klan's presence in the community were the subject of criticism. Critics including Gloversville Mayor Dayton King said the article overestimated the number of Klan members in the area, made multiple factual errors, and resembled a "recruiting effort" for the KKK.

References

External links

Daily newspapers published in New York (state)
Publications with year of establishment missing